Brent McAthey (born August 4, 1967) is a Canadian country music artist. McAthey has released six studio albums. He reached the Top 20 of the RPM Country Tracks chart in 1998 with "Chevy Blue Eyes."

Discography

Albums

Singles

References

External links

1967 births
Canadian country singer-songwriters
Canadian male singers
Living people
Musicians from Calgary
Canadian male singer-songwriters